Joshua Da Silva (born 19 June 1998) is a Trinidadian cricketer. He made his domestic debut in 2018 for Trinidad and Tobago, and his international debut for the West Indies cricket team in December 2020.

Personal life
Da Silva is of Portuguese descent, with his ancestors hailing from Madeira. Both his mother and paternal grandmother were Portuguese Canadians, while his father is a Trinidadian. He was educated at Saint Mary's College in Port of Spain.

Domestic career
Joshua started playing cricket while attending Saint Mary's College and has also played for QPCC (Queens Park Cricket Club). He made his first-class debut for Trinidad and Tobago in the 2018–19 Regional Four Day Competition on 13 December 2018. In October 2019, he was named in the West Indies Emerging Team for the 2019–20 Regional Super50 tournament. He made his List A debut on 7 November 2019, for the West Indies Emerging Team in the 2019–20 Regional Super50 tournament. In January 2020, in the opening round of the 2019–20 West Indies Championship, Da Silva scored his maiden century in first-class cricket, with an unbeaten 113.

In July 2020, he was named in the St Kitts & Nevis Patriots squad for the 2020 Caribbean Premier League (CPL). He made his Twenty20 debut on 18 August 2020, for the St Kitts & Nevis Patriots in the 2020 CPL.

In June 2020, Da Silva was named as one of eleven reserve players in the West Indies' Test squad, for their series against England. The Test series was originally scheduled to start in May 2020, but was moved back to July 2020 due to the COVID-19 pandemic. On the third day of the third Test of the series, Da Silva was used as a substitute wicket-keeper in the match, after Shane Dowrich suffered an on-field injury.

International career
In October 2020, Da Silva was named as one of six reserve players for the West Indies' Test squad for their series against New Zealand. Ahead of the second Test of the series, Da Silva was added to the squad for the match as a replacement for Shane Dowrich, who left the tour due to personal reasons. He made his Test debut for the West Indies, against New Zealand, on 11 December 2020. This made him the first Caribbean-born white player to play Test cricket for the West Indies since Geoff Greenidge 50 years prior.

In December 2020, Da Silva was named in the West Indies' One Day International (ODI) squad for their series against Bangladesh. He made his ODI debut for the West Indies, against Bangladesh, on 20 January 2021.

In March 2022, Da Silva scored his maiden Test century, at St George's in Grenada, against England.

References

External links
 

1998 births
Living people
West Indies Test cricketers
West Indies One Day International cricketers
St Kitts and Nevis Patriots cricketers
Trinidad and Tobago cricketers
West Indies Emerging Team cricketers
Place of birth missing (living people)
Trinidad and Tobago people of Portuguese descent
Wicket-keepers